Hidden City of Taurmond is the debut album by the electropop/noise pop band Wizardzz.  It was released on March 21, 2006 under the independent label Load Records.

Track listing
"Disembark" – 0:46
"Sailship" – 2:52
"Whispers from Wallface" – 3:00
"Glimpse of the Hidden City" – 1:59
"Jelipper-Lilly Field" – 3:17
" 'Do Come In!' (Tea and Chulliwugs)" – 1:27
"Sea Battle at Orkusk" – 4:16
"Diamond Mirror" – 1:20
"Chasing Our Shadows" – 2:57
"Ambushed by a Time Quagga" – 1:12
"Bubiliad Woods of Taurmond" – 6:13
"Ladydragons" – 7:29
"Rest at the Gate" – 1:58
"Mimi Vivian Sunrise" (Live) – 5:24

External links
Wizardzz Homepage on Load Records
 Hometown Heroes Review

2006 debut albums